Doctor Who: Thirty Years in the TARDIS is a special 50-minute television documentary celebrating the 30th anniversary of the science-fiction series Doctor Who. It was originally broadcast on Monday, 29 November 1993, on BBC One (BBC Two in Scotland).

The programme was the first BBC-produced, in-depth documentary chronicling Doctor Who since the earlier Whose Doctor Who was broadcast in April 1977. (A 30-minute, categorized compilation of archive clips was broadcast in 1992 on BBC2 entitled Resistance is Useless.) The show featured many clips from the show's episodes, and interviews with the cast and crew. Several iconic scenes from the show were recreated, with young actor Josh Maguire playing the part of a child imagining himself involved in the settings.

The interviewees included Carole Ann Ford, Verity Lambert, Roberta Tovey, Jennie Linden, William Hartnell's granddaughter Jessica Carney, Deborah Watling, Frazer Hines, Nicholas Courtney, Jon Pertwee, Elisabeth Sladen, Colin Baker, Nicola Bryant, Sylvester McCoy, Sophie Aldred and Alan Yentob.

The show was never repeated on the BBC, but an expanded version premiered at BAFTA on 5 November 1994 titled Even More Than Thirty Years in the TARDIS. It was followed by a 90-minute release on VHS titled More Than... Thirty Years in the TARDIS, which included many interviews and clips not in the broadcast version. In 2013, More Than... Thirty Years in the TARDIS was released on DVD as part of The Legacy Collection box set, alongside the uncompleted 1979 Doctor Who serial Shada.

The programme was produced and directed by Kevin Davies, with Sue Kerr as executive producer. Davies's initial idea for the programme was a part-documentary, part-drama called The Legend Begins, combining interviews with Doctor Who's creators with dramatised sequences showing how the events took place. It evolved into a proposal called Eulogy for the Doctor, featuring several actors who had appeared as the Doctor's companions, returning to their roles for a drama linking archive clips from the series. Eventually, all of these ideas were scaled down or abandoned in favour of a straightforward documentary format. In 2013, the idea of a drama depicting the origins of Doctor Who was used for An Adventure in Space and Time, broadcast on BBC Two, commemorating the series's 50th anniversary.

References

Thirty
1993 in British television
British science fiction television shows
BBC television documentaries
English-language television shows